Phyllonorycter cretata is a moth of the family Gracillariidae. It is known from Japan (Hokkaidō) and the Russian Far East.

The larvae feed on Quercus crispula, Quercus mongolica and Quercus serrata. They mine the leaves of their host plant. The mine has the form of a small, yellowish, tentiform mine, between two veins on the lower surface of the leaf.

References

cretata
Moths of Asia

Moths of Japan
Leaf miners
Taxa named by Tosio Kumata
Moths described in 1957